Iera may refer to:
Iera Echebarría, (born 1992) Spanish rugby player
Iera (Lesbos), town on ancient Lesbos, Greece

See also
IERA